The Last Dubber is a remix album by industrial metal band Ministry. The album is composed of remixes from the band's 2007 album The Last Sucker.

Track listing

Personnel
See original album credits to The Last Sucker
Clayton Worbeck - Remixing and additional programming and production (tracks 1–10)
John Bechdel - Remixing (track 11)
DJ Hardware - Remixing (track 12)

References

2009 remix albums
Albums produced by Al Jourgensen
Ministry (band) albums
Industrial remix albums
Cultural depictions of George W. Bush